Doctores metro station is a station of the Mexico City Metro in Cuauhtémoc, Mexico City. It is an underground station with two side platforms, served by Line 8 (the Green Line), between Salto del Agua and Obrera stations. It serves the colonias (neighborhoods) of Doctores and Obrera, and its name is on account of its proximity to the first one, whose streets are primarily named after physicians; the pictogram depicts a couple of them. Doctores metro station opened on 20 July 1994 with service northward toward Garibaldi and southeastward toward Constitución de 1917 stations. In 2019, the station had an average daily ridership of 12,334 passengers, making it the 138th busiest station in the network and the twelfth busiest of the line.

Location

Doctores is a metro station located on Eje Central, in central Mexico City. The station serves the colonias (Mexican Spanish for "neighborhoods") of Doctores and Obrera. Within the system, the station lies between Salto del Agua and Obrera metro stations. The area is serviced by Line 1 (formerly Line A) of the trolleybus system.

Exits
There are four exits:
Northeast: Eje Central (Lázaro Cárdenas Avenue) and Chimalpopoca Street, Doctores.
Northwest: Eje Central and Dr. Pascua Street, Doctores.
Southeast: Eje Central and Lucas Alaman Street, Obrera.
Southwest: Eje Central and Dr. Liceaga Street, Obrera.

History and construction
Line 8 of the Mexico City Metro was built by Empresas ICA. Its first and only section opened on 20 July 1994, operating from Garibaldi to Constitución de 1917 metro stations. Workers uncovered "floors, walls, rammed earth, offerings, canals, chinampas and piles" while they were building the tunnel between José María Izazaga and Chimalpopoca Streets, between Doctores and Salto del Agua stations.

The station's pictogram features the silhouette of two physicians and it is named after the Doctores neighborhood, whose streets are named after academic physicians active during La Reforma, an era when the Liberal Party dominated the political life of the country after the ouster of the Conservative Party through the Plan of Ayutla in 1855.

Incidents
Due to heavy rains in the area, and the subsequent water accumulation in the tunnel, all the stations from Doctores to Iztacalco were closed on 3 July 2021.

Ridership
According to the data provided by the authorities since the 2000s, commuters have averaged per year between 7,800 and 13,300 daily entrances in the last decade. In 2019, before the impact of the COVID-19 pandemic on public transport, the station's ridership totaled 4,502,133 passengers, which was an increase of 108,763 passengers compared to 2018. In the same year, Doctores was the 138th busiest station of the system's 195 stations, and it was the line's 12th busiest.

Gallery

Notes

References

External links

1994 establishments in Mexico
Azulejos in buildings in Mexico
Mexico City Metro Line 8 stations
Mexico City Metro stations in Cuauhtémoc, Mexico City
Murals in Mexico
Railway stations located underground in Mexico
Railway stations opened in 1994